Sara Chacón Zúñiga, or "Sarita" Chacón Zúñiga (Guayaquil, June 1914 – New York, January 1998) became the first winner of the Miss Ecuador title, awarded on February 11, 1930. She held on to the title for 25 years because due to national and international conflicts another contest was not held until 1955. She died in New York in January 1998.

Marriage
On December 7, 1930 Chacón married Carlos Freile Espinel despite her parents' disapproval.

References 

Miss Ecuador
People from Guayaquil
1914 births
1998 deaths
Ecuadorian beauty pageant winners